Draper Tools Ltd is a British distributor of tools for professional and consumer use, based at a 50,000m2 (535,000 sq. ft.) site in Chandler's Ford in Hampshire, England.

History

Draper Tools started in 1919, when Bert Draper ran a business of trading government surplus and tools in Kingston upon Thames. The company was called B. Draper & Son Limited, and operated as a wholesaler for brands such as King Dick, as well as its own B.D.S. brand.

The company moved to the Chandler's Ford site in 1963, under the management of Bert's son, Norman Draper. The company formed international partnerships with manufacturers such as Elora Werkzeugfabrik GmbH and Knipex. Since Norman's death in 1994, the company has been run by his son, John Draper.

In 2009, the company opened a new  350,000 sq ft industrial unit warehouse facility in North Baddesley Hampshire.

Sponsorship
The company was a sponsor of Southampton football club between 1984 and 1993. The company has also been a perimeter board advertiser and sponsor of Southampton's big screen LCD football scoreboard.

Draper sponsored Solent Stars basketball team between 1986 and 1987.

References

Tool manufacturing companies of the United Kingdom
Manufacturing companies established in 1919
British brands
Companies based in Hampshire
1919 establishments in the United Kingdom
Power tool manufacturers